Michael Ernest Smith (born 1953) is an American archaeologist working primarily with Aztec and general Mesoamerican archaeology. He has written numerous scholarly articles about central Mexican archaeology as well as several books about the Aztecs, among them a widely used textbook (Smith 2003). He is currently Professor of Anthropology in the School of Human Evolution and Social Change at Arizona State University. He is known for stressing the importance of assessing archaeological evidence independently of the ethnohistorical sources, and advocating its use as a source of knowledge about the Aztecs.

Published works
Smith's publications include:

Notes

External links
 Publishing Archaeology – Smith's blog
 
 

1953 births
American archaeologists
Mesoamerican archaeologists
Aztec scholars
Living people
20th-century Mesoamericanists
21st-century Mesoamericanists